Jesus Freak is the fourth studio album by the American Christian rap and rock trio DC Talk, released on November 21, 1995, on ForeFront Records. The style was a marked departure from the group's previous releases, incorporating a heavier rock sound and elements of grunge that was popular at the time.

The album was released to both critical and commercial acclaim. It peaked at number 16 on the Billboard 200 and six of the album's seven singles reached number one across various Christian radio formats. It won the 1997 Grammy Award for Best Rock Gospel Album.

Jesus Freak is widely considered to be one of the greatest and most influential albums in the history of contemporary Christian music (CCM).

Background
After three albums of hip-hop oriented sound, including DC Talk's Grammy award-winning third album, Free at Last, which was based primarily on hip-hop- and pop-oriented songwriting, the trio decided to innovate and reinvent their style.

After three years, DC Talk returned with songs featuring a more alternative rock sound. Thus, the album's lead single, "Jesus Freak", was considered unexpected by fans and critics alike.

Michael Tait said, "I was totally into rock and roll at the time [...] I really wanted to make a rock record." The band decided to focus on more rock-oriented music, with touches of rap and pop interwoven into the mix. Tait later explained, "We wanted to write songs that would hopefully touch a generation."

Recording and production
Compared to DC Talk's other albums, Jesus Freak was, stylistically, an experiment. The album was a fusion of various musical genres, including pop, rock, and grunge, all combined with hip hop.

The title track, "Jesus Freak," is also of historical importance. It is believed to be the first link between grunge and rapcore in CCM. The song was even played on some secular stations.

In addition, the album contains two cover songs: "Day by Day," from the musical Godspell, and a heavily overhauled version of "In the Light" originally by Charlie Peacock. Two spoken-word samples are also heard; "Mind's Eye" features the words of Billy Graham and "What If I Stumble" contains a quote from Brennan Manning.

Lyrical themes
As with the genres, the themes of Jesus Freak are varied, ranging from the spiritual–such as accepting Jesus, hypocrisy, atheism–to the social, such as seeking forgiveness from a friend, racism, facing intolerance, and acceptance.

Track listing

Release
Jesus Freak was released on November 21, 1995. It debuted at number 16 on the Billboard 200, selling over 85,800 copies in its first week of release. This number was the highest debut for a Christian album at the time.

After the album, released through ForeFront Records, proved to be extremely successful, the band signed an exclusive distribution deal with Virgin Records. The label made it a priority to promote the album to mainstream music fans. Due to this promotional increase, "Between You and Me" became a hit for the band, managing to chart on the Billboard Hot 100.

Reception

After the initial success of its release, Jesus Freak was RIAA-certified as Gold by its first month, for shipments exceeding 500,000 units. The album has gone on to sell over two million copies in the United States, achieving double platinum certification by the RIAA. Critical response to Jesus Freak was generally positive, and many of the album's singles were met with positive reception. For instance, "Jesus Freak" was the first non-AC song to win the Dove Award for Song of the Year. The album also spawned several hit singles. Six of the album's singles became number-one hits across various Christian radio formats. "Between You and Me" was even a cross-over hit on secular radio, peaking at number 29 on the Billboard Hot 100.

Legacy

The album is considered one of the greatest and most influential Christian albums of all time and is viewed as a landmark of the 1990s alternative rock scene.

It is one of the biggest-selling Christian albums of all time and has been certified double platinum in the United States and gold in Canada.

On June 20, 2006, Gotee Records released a ten-year anniversary tribute, Freaked!, featuring artists from record labels Gotee and Mono vs Stereo covering songs from the original album. "In the Light" and "Jesus Freak" are both featured in Alive and Transported. In addition, the songs are still regularly sung in tobyMac, Kevin Max, and Newsboys concerts.

In 2006, EMI released a commemorative 10th-anniversary version of the album, Jesus Freak: 10th Anniversary Special Edition. This special edition contained a bonus disc of brand-new remixes, rarities, live tracks, and demos. A single-disc remaster was released in 2013.

For the 20th anniversary of the album in November 2015, SMLXLVinyl.com released a double lp 180-gram vinyl of the album. It was its first pressing on the format.

Chart positions

Personnel 
DC Talk
 TobyMac – raps, lead and backing vocals
 Kevin Max – lead and backing vocals, poem (13)
 Michael Tait – lead and backing vocals, additional BGV arrangements (1, 4, 7, 8, 10, 12)

Musicians
 Mark Heimermann – programming (1, 2, 3, 5, 7, 11, 13), Hammond B3 organ (1, 3, 5, 7, 11, 12), upright bass (3), additional vocal arrangements (4), Wurlitzer electric piano (5), pads (7, 12), finger cymbals (8), Moog synthesizer (8), acoustic piano (10), broom (12), keyboards (13)
 Dann Huff – programming (1), guitars (1, 3, 5, 7, 13)
 George Cocchini – guitars (2, 13)
 Chris Rodriguez – guitars (2, 4, 10)
 Oran Thornton – guitars (3, 5, 8)
 Sean Turner – guitars (3)
 Jerry McPherson – mandolin (4), guitars (11, 12)
 Brent Barcus – guitars (5), bridge arrangements (10)
 Dave Perkins – guitars (11)
 Jackie Street – bass (1, 2, 12)
 Otto Price – bass (2, 5, 7, 10), bridge arrangements (10), wah bass (11)
 John Mark Painter – bass (3, 4, 11), accordion (4), guitars (4)
 Brent Milligan – bass (8)
 Jimmie Lee Sloas – bass (13)
 Scott Williamson – drums (1, 11), drum fills (7), hi-hat (7)
 Aaron Smith – drums (2, 10)
 David Huff – drums (3, 5, 12)
 Shaun McWilliams – drums (4)
 Will Denton – drums (8), bridge arrangements (10)
 Todd Collins – bongos (1, 12), loops (1, 12), programming (3, 5, 7, 11, 12), drums (3), cowbell (3), percussion (4), congas (5, 7), tambourine (5), cabasa (7), vocals (9), brush snare (11), Akai MPC60 (13)
 Terry McMillan – percussion (2, 10, 13)
 Greg Herrington – loops (10)
 Denis Solee – flute (11)
 Ronn Huff – string arrangements and conductor (2, 10)
 Jason Halbert – bridge arrangements (10)
 Brennan Manning – ragamuffin intro (4)
 Charlie Peacock – guest vocals (10)
 Billy Graham – spoken word (12)

Production 
 Dan R.Brock – executive producer
 Eddie DeGarmo – executive producer
 Toby McKeehan – producer, collage photos
 Mark Heimermann – producer (1, 2, 3, 5-13)
 John Mark Painter – producer (4)
 Joe Baldridge – engineer, mixing, collage photos
 Lynn Fuston – string recording
 Russ Long – additional engineer
 Todd Robbins – additional engineer
 Dave Dillbeck – assistant engineer
 Dan Fritzsell – assistant engineer (1, 2, 3, 5-13)
 Patrick Murphy – assistant engineer (1, 2, 3, 5-13)
 Ed Sharpe – assistant engineer (1, 2, 3, 5-13)
 Penn Singleton – assistant engineer (1, 2, 3, 5-13)
 Shane Wilson – assistant engineer (1, 2, 3, 5-13)
 Chuck Linder – mix assistant
 Ronnie Thomas – editing at MasterMix (Nashville, Tennessee)
 Ken Love – mastering at MasterMix (Nashville, Tennessee)
 Nate Yetton – A&R
 Kevin Max Smith – art direction
 Paul Venaas – design, layout 
 John Falls – individual band photos
 Norman Jean Roy – back cover photography

Music videos
Colored People
Jesus Freak
Day by Day
Between You and Me

References
McNeil, W. K. Encyclopedia of American Gospel Music. Routledge, 2005. 
Taff, Tori. 100 Greatest Songs in Christian Music. Integrity, 2006.

Notes

DC Talk albums
1995 albums
ForeFront Records albums
Grammy Award for Best Rock Gospel Album